The Norwegian Minister of Labour and Social Inclusion is the head of the Norwegian Ministry of Labour and Social Inclusion. The position has existed since 1 January 1846, when the Ministry of the Interior was created. Several different names have been used since then, with three name changes after 2000. The incumbent minister is Marte Mjøs Persen of the Labour Party. From 1992 to 2001 there was also a Minister of Health position in the ministry.

List of ministers
Parties

Ministry of the Interior (1846–1903)

Ministry of Social Affairs, Trade, Industry and Fisheries (1913–1916)

Ministry of Social Affairs (1916–2005)

Ministry of Labour (1885–1946)
The labour tasks were transferred to the Ministry of Local Government in 1948, where it was until 1989 and again from 1992 to 1997. Labour responsibilities were returned to social affairs in 2002, and inclusion was added to the title in 2006.

Ministry of Labour and Social Inclusion (2006–present)

Consultative ministers

List of Norwegian Ministers of Health within the Ministry of Health and Social Affairs

For later Ministers, see Minister of Health and Care Services (Norway).

Notes

References

Norwegian Ministry of Labour and Social Inclusion – Councillor of State – Government.no
Norwegian Ministry of Health and Social Affairs, Health Affairs – Councillor of State – Government.no

Labour and Social Inclusion